The 1994 Laurie O'Reilly Cup was the first edition of the competition and was held on 2nd September at Sydney.
New Zealand won the O'Reilly Cup after defeating Australia 0–37.

The match was the first official test for the Australia women's national rugby union team.

Match

References 

Laurie O'Reilly Cup
Australia women's national rugby union team
New Zealand women's national rugby union team
Laurie O'Reilly Cup